In probability and statistics the extended negative binomial distribution is a discrete probability distribution extending the negative binomial distribution. It is a truncated version of the negative binomial distribution for which estimation methods have been studied. 

In the context of actuarial science, the distribution appeared in its general form in a paper by K. Hess, A. Liewald and K.D. Schmidt when they characterized all distributions for which the extended Panjer recursion works. For the case , the distribution was already discussed by Willmot and put into a parametrized family with the logarithmic distribution and the negative binomial distribution by H.U. Gerber.

Probability mass function

and

where

is the (generalized) binomial coefficient and  denotes the gamma function.

Probability generating function

For the important case , hence , this simplifies to

References

Discrete distributions
Factorial and binomial topics